The École Nationale Supérieure des Industries Agricoles et Alimentaires, or ENSIA, was a French grande école of agriculture, located in Massy, near Paris. It was affiliated to the Ministry of Agriculture.
The school was founded in 1893 and merged into AgroParisTech in 2006.

After initial training in food science and engineering, students are able to contribute to research / production project and development of the food industries. The ENSIA graduate has the know-how in industrial processes, food product, quality and management.

Research at ENSIA is strongly associated with teams from national scientific research institutes (INRA, CNRS, CIRAD, CEMAGREF, ...) and universities. ENSIA also develops partnerships with various food companies.

Initial training :

 Received Master's degree (Food Science Engineer Diploma) in food engineering
 Received Master's degree (Food Science Engineer Diploma) in food engineering specialized in Mediterranean and tropical agro-products.
Received Master of Science in Mediterranean and tropical food science and technology
Asian-European master's degree programme in food science and technology (taught in English in SEA).

PhD programmes
Food science
Food process engineering
Biology and microbiology

Continuous education 

Professional master's degree
350 students
100 graduate students conducting research
50 teachers-researchers
70 technical and administrative staff

References

See also

Agronomy schools
Universities in Île-de-France
Agricultural organizations based in France
Food technology organizations
Massy
Soil and crop science organizations
Educational institutions established in 1893
1893 establishments in France